The Battle of Tondibi was the decisive confrontation in the 16th-century invasion of the Songhai Empire by the army of the Saadi dynasty in Morocco. Though vastly outnumbered, the Moroccan forces under Judar Pasha defeated the Songhai Askia Ishaq II, guaranteeing the empire's downfall.

Background
The Songhai had been the dominant force in Western Africa for more than a century, controlling the Western Sudan from the headwaters of the Senegal River to what is now Niger; however, a rivalry for succession after the 1583 death of Askia Daoud left the Empire in a weakened state.

Meanwhile, to the north, the Saadi Dynasty of Morocco was at the height of its power. In 1578, Morocco successfully repelled an attempt by Portugal to conquer it at the Battle of Alcácer Quibir, where its forces decimated a large Portuguese army. However, the expense of paying for the defences used to hold off the Portuguese was a large strain on Morocco. The nation's coffers were depleted, and Morocco was on the verge of bankruptcy. In search of new resources for his kingdom, Sultan Ahmad I al-Mansur Saadi turned his attention to the Songhai Empire, where he erroneously believed the gold mines from which its wealth came were located.

Desert crossing
Though many of his advisors warned that it was illegal to wage war against another Muslim nation, he swept their objections aside.  In October 1590, he dispatched a force of 1,500 light cavalry and 2,500 infantry, many of whom were equipped with arquebuses.  The command he entrusted to Judar Pasha, a Spanish eunuch who had been captured as a child.  The army travelled with a transport train of 8,000 camels, 1,000 packhorses, 1,000 stablemen, and 600 labourers; they also transported eight Turkish cannons.

After a four-month journey, Judar reached Songhai territory with his forces largely intact. His forces captured, plundered, and razed the salt mines at Taghaza. The Moroccans then advanced on the Songhai capital of Gao.

Battle
On 13 March 1591, the armies met. From Taghaza, the Moroccan army marched towards Gao. The Songhai army awaited Judar's force near Tondibi, a cattle pasture just north of Gao. Though the Songhai had a powerful cavalry, they lacked the Moroccan's gunpowder weapons, which would turn the tide of the battle. The Songhai battle strategy was poorly thought out, as their plan to send a stampede of 1,000 cattle to break down the Moroccan lines and to cover their infantry (who lacked the technology of gunpowder weapons) failed, with the cattle charge being repelled by the noise of gunfire and the sound of cannons, which caused the cattle to stampede back towards Songhai lines. The Songhai infantry continued to pursue the Moroccan army as planned but they were slaughtered by Moroccan arquebuses. The Songhai army then sent their cavalry to charge at the Moroccan lines. After an initial cavalry skirmish, Judar manoeuvred his arquebusiers into place and opened fire with both arquebuses and cannons. The remaining Songhai cavalry fled the field or were massacred by Moroccan gunfire. At last, only the rearguard, a unit of brave and resolute men remained, facing the Moroccans who they fought in hand-to-hand combat until they were killed.

Consequences
Judar Pasha continued onto Gao and sacked the city, whose residents had already evacuated, but finding little in the way of riches soon moved on to the richer trading centers of Timbuktu and Djenné. The looting of the three cities marked the end of the Songhai Empire as an effective force in the region; however, Morocco proved likewise unable to assert firm control over the area due to the vastness of the Songhai Empire and difficulties of communication and resupply across the Saharan trade routes, and a decade of sporadic fighting began. The area eventually splintered into dozens of smaller kingdoms, and the Songhai themselves moved east to the only surviving province of Dendi and continued the Songhai tradition for the next two and a half centuries.

There were also domestic troubles and when, in 1603, the sultan died (presumably by the plague which swept through Morocco at the time, or at the hands of one of his sons according to some) a war of succession broke out. Soon all that was left of his legacy was Marrakesh, local warlords, the Portuguese and the Spanish having taken over the rest.

References

External links
The Invasion of Morocco in 1591 and the Saadian Dynasty

Tondibi 1591
Songhai Empire
16th century in Mali
16th century in Africa
Conflicts in 1591
Military history of Mali
1591 in Africa